Miki Sakai (Sakai Miki, 酒井美紀), born 21 February 1978 in Aoi-ku, Shizuoka, Japan is an actress and J-pop idol singer.

As a teenager she made her feature film debut in the 1995 Shunji Iwai film Love Letter playing the role of Itsuki Fujii as a young girl. The film was a huge box-office success and Miki picked up a number of awards for her role including a Japanese Academy Award for 'Newcomer of the Year'.

She also starred in Hagusen nagashi (1996) on TV as well as in numerous other television series and movies. Miki's portrayal of the character Tomie in the 2001 horror movie Tomie: Re-birth was one of the more popular interpretations of the role.

In January 2008, Miki Sakai appeared in the 10-hour long TV historical drama Tokugawa Fūunroku Hachidai Shōgun Yoshimune.

Filmography

Film
 Love Letter (1995), young Itsuki Fujii
 Himeyuri no Tō (1995)
 Nagareita shichinin (1997)
 Abduction (1997), Mayo
 To Love (1997), Mitsu Morita
 Juvenile (2000), Noriko Kinoshita
 Tomie: Re-birth (2001), Tomie Kawakami
 Samayou Yaiba (2009), Wakako Kijima
 Kamen Rider OOO Wonderful: The Shogun and the 21 Core Medals (2011)
 Tomie: Unlimited (2011), Tomie (cameo)
 You Are Brilliant Like a Spica (2019)
 Talking the Pictures (2019)
 Akira and Akira (2022)

Television
 Hakusen Nagashi (1996), Sonoko Nanakura
 Hakusen Nagashi: Spring at Age 19 (1997), Sonoko Nanakura
 Hakusen Nagashi: The Wind at Age 20 (1999), Sonoko Nanakura
 Aoi Tokugawa Sandai (2000), Tokugawa Masako
 Hakusen Nagashi: The Poem of Travels (2001), Sonoko Nanakura
 Hakusen Nagashi: Age 25 (2003), Sonoko Nanakura
 Hakusen Nagashi: The Final: Even as the Times of Dreaming have Passed (2005), Sonoko Nanakura
 Tokugawa Fūunroku Hachidai Shōgun Yoshimune (2008)
 Showa Genroku Rakugo Shinju (2018), Oei
 Because We Forget Everything (2022)

Awards

References

External links
 Official profile 
 
 

1978 births
Living people
Japanese actresses
People from Shizuoka (city)
Musicians from Shizuoka Prefecture
21st-century Japanese singers
21st-century Japanese women singers